Kaunas Jesuit Gymnasium is a private Catholic primary and secondary gymnasium, located in Kaunas, Lithuania. Established in 1649, the school is operated by the Society of Jesus and offers an education from kindergarten to the International Baccalaureate.

Notable alumni 

 Vladas Michelevičius (1924–2008), bishop
 Juozas Miltinis (1907–1994), theater director, actor, Panevezys Drama Theatre founder
 Zenonas Puzinauskas (1920–1995), 1937 and 1939 European Men's Basketball Champion
 Vincentas Sladkevičius (1920–2000), Cardinal, Archbishop of Kaunas

See also

 Education in Lithuania
 List of Jesuit schools
 Vilnius Jesuit High School

References

Bibliography
 Kaunas Jesuit gymnasium. - Kaunas: new bow, 2004. - 200 p .: pictures. - 
 Vysniauskas M., Adam Mickiewicz hut Kaunas // Kaunas History Yearbook 13 t., In 2013.

Jesuit secondary schools in Lithuania
Jesuit primary schools in Lithuania
Educational institutions established in the 1640s
1649 establishments in Europe
International Baccalaureate schools in Lithuania
Jesu